The 35th parallel north is a circle of latitude that is 35 degrees north of the Earth's equatorial plane. It crosses Africa, the Mediterranean Sea, Asia, the Pacific Ocean, North America and the Atlantic Ocean.

In the United States, the parallel defines the southern border of Tennessee, and the border between North Carolina and Georgia, as well as the tripoint of Arizona–California–Nevada.

At this northern latitude, the Sun is visible for 14 hours, 31 minutes on its summer solstice (in June) and for 9 hours, 48 minutes on its winter solstice (in December).

This parallel is sometimes used to define the northern boundary of the subtropics.

Around the world
Starting at the Prime Meridian and heading eastwards, the parallel 35° north passes through:

{| class="wikitable plainrowheaders"
! scope="col" | Co-ordinates
! scope="col" | Country, territory or sea
! scope="col" | Notes
|-
| 
! scope="row" | 
|
|-
| 
! scope="row" | 
|
|-
| style="background:#b0e0e6;" | 
! scope="row" style="background:#b0e0e6;" | Mediterranean Sea
| style="background:#b0e0e6;" |
|-
| 
! scope="row" | 
| Island of Crete
|-
| style="background:#b0e0e6;" | 
! scope="row" style="background:#b0e0e6;" | Mediterranean Sea
| style="background:#b0e0e6;" |
|-
| 
! scope="row" | 
| Including, for a short distance, the United Nations Buffer Zone in Cyprus
|-valign="top"
| 
! scope="row" | Dhekelia
|  Sovereign Base Area (not part of the territory of the Republic of Cyprus)
|-
| 
! scope="row" | 
|
|-
| style="background:#b0e0e6;" | 
! scope="row" style="background:#b0e0e6;" | Mediterranean Sea
| style="background:#b0e0e6;" |
|-
| 
! scope="row" | 
|
|-
| 
! scope="row" | 
|
|-
| 
! scope="row" | 
| Passing through Saveh
|-
| 
! scope="row" | 
|
|-valign="top"
| 
! scope="row" | 
| Khyber Pakhtunkhwa Azad Kashmir – claimed by  Gilgit-Baltistan – claimed by 
|-
| 
! scope="row" | 
|Ladakh – claimed by 
|-
| 
! scope="row" | Aksai Chin
|-valign="top"
| 
! scope="row" | 
| Tibet Qinghai Gansu Shaanxi Gansu Shaanxi Shanxi Henan Shandong Jiangsu
|-
| style="background:#b0e0e6;" | 
! scope="row" style="background:#b0e0e6;" | Yellow Sea
| style="background:#b0e0e6;" |
|-
| 
! scope="row" | 
|| South Jeolla ProvinceSouth Gyeongsang Provincepassing just south of Busan
|-
| style="background:#b0e0e6;" | 
! scope="row" style="background:#b0e0e6;" | Sea of Japan
| style="background:#b0e0e6;" |
|-valign="top"
| 
! scope="row" | 
| Island of Honshu:— Shimane Prefecture— Hiroshima Prefecture— Okayama Prefecture— Hyōgo Prefecture— Osaka Prefecture— Kyoto Prefecture – passing through central Kyoto city— Shiga Prefecture – passing through central Ōtsu city— Mie Prefecture— Aichi Prefecture— Shizuoka Prefecture – passing just north of Shizuoka city
|-
| style="background:#b0e0e6;" | 
! scope="row" style="background:#b0e0e6;" | Pacific Ocean
| style="background:#b0e0e6;" | Sagami Bay
|-valign="top"
| 
! scope="row" | 
| Island of Honshu:— Chiba Prefecture – the southern tip of the Bōsō Peninsula
|-
| style="background:#b0e0e6;" | 
| style="background:#b0e0e6;" | Pacific Ocean
| style="background:#b0e0e6;" |
|-valign="top"
| 
! scope="row" | 
|  California – passing just north of Santa Maria Arizona–California–Nevada tripoint Arizona New Mexico – passing just south of Albuquerque Texas Oklahoma Arkansas Tennessee / Mississippi border Tennessee / Alabama border Tennessee / Georgia border North Carolina / Georgia border South Carolina North Carolina – passing through Fayetteville
|-
| style="background:#b0e0e6;" | 
! scope="row" style="background:#b0e0e6;" | Atlantic Ocean
| style="background:#b0e0e6;" |
|-
| 
! scope="row" | 
| Passing through Ksar el-Kebir
|-
| 
! scope="row" | 
|
|}

See also
 34th parallel north
 36th parallel north

References

n35
Borders of Tennessee
Borders of Mississippi
Borders of Alabama
Borders of Georgia (U.S. state)
Borders of North Carolina